Walter James Curley  (1874–1920), was a professional baseball player who played second base in the Major Leagues for the 1899 Chicago Orphans of the National League. He went to college at College of the Holy Cross, the University of Massachusetts Amherst and the University of Virginia.

Sources
 Baseball Reference

Chicago Orphans players
Baseball players from Massachusetts
Major League Baseball second basemen
1874 births
1920 deaths
19th-century baseball players
Springfield Ponies players
Springfield Maroons players
Holy Cross Crusaders baseball players
UMass Minutemen baseball players
Virginia Cavaliers baseball players
Concord Marines players